Lena Smedsaas (20 March 1951 – 6 January 2014) was a Swedish journalist and writer.

Born in Solna Municipality, she began her career in journalism in 1973 and was best known for being a political commentator, presenter and editor for TV4Nyheterna on TV4.

Lena Smedsaas died from cancer on 6 January 2014, aged 62, in Täby. She was survived by her husband, writer and journalist Claes-Göran Kjellander and their two children.

References

1951 births
2014 deaths
People from Solna Municipality
Swedish journalists
Swedish women journalists
Swedish television hosts
News editors
Political commentators
20th-century Swedish women writers
Deaths from cancer in Sweden
Swedish women television presenters